Pedro Pérez de Guzmán y Zúñiga (Sp.: Don Pedro Pérez de Guzmán y Zúñiga, primer Conde de Olivares, Seville, 1503 – Madrid, 14 July 1569) was the founder of the House of Olivares, a cadet branch of the House of Medina Sidonia.

Biography

Pedro Pérez de Guzmán was a younger son of Juan Alfonso Pérez de Guzmán, 3rd Duke of Medina Sidonia.  His father acquired Olivares, Seville for him from Ferdinand II of Aragon in 1507.  Pedro Pérez de Guzmán entered the service of Charles V, Holy Roman Emperor, and, as a reward for his services in Italy, Germany, and Tunisia, Charles V granted Pedro Pérez de Guzmán the Spanish noble title of Count of Olivares in Palermo on October 12, 1535.

Olivares took advantage of papal bulls issued by Pope Clement VII in 1529 and Pope Paul III in 1536 to purchase land formerly held by the military orders.  In 1532, he purchased Castilleja de Alcántar (which he renamed Castilleja de Guzmán), Heliche, and Huévar del Aljarafe; the next year, he acquired Castilleja de la Cuesta.

He was succeeded as Count of Olivares by his son, Enrique de Guzmán, 2nd Count of Olivares, the father of Gaspar de Guzmán, Count-Duke of Olivares.

References

This article is based on this article on Spanish Wikipedia.

Counts of Spain
House of Medina Sidonia
16th-century Spanish nobility